, aka Tora-san's Homeward Journey, Am I Trying? Part II, and Torasan Pt. 2, is a 1969 Japanese comedy film directed by Yoji Yamada. It stars Kiyoshi Atsumi as Kuruma Torajirō (Tora-san), and Orie Satō as his love interest or "Madonna". Tora-san's Cherished Mother is the second entry in the popular, long-running Otoko wa Tsurai yo series.

Synopsis
Tora-san hears that his mother is still alive and returns to Tokyo to track her down. He discovers that she is a geisha who had had only a brief affair with his father. While visiting the family, he falls in love with Natsuko, the daughter of an old teacher.

Cast
 Kiyoshi Atsumi as Torajiro
 Chieko Baisho as Sakura
 Chōchō Miyako as Okiku
 Orie Satō as Natsuko Tsubouchi
 Tsutomu Yamazaki as Kaoru Fujimura
 Chieko Misaki as Torajiro's aunt
 Gin Maeda as Hiroshi Suwa
 Masaaki Tsusaka as Noboru Kawamata
 Akiko Kazami as Osumi
 Hisao Dazai as Umetarō Katsura (Print Shop)

Critical appraisal
Kiyoshi Atsumi was given the Best Actor award at the Mainichi Film Awards for his performance in this film and the previous entry in the series, It's Tough Being a Man (also 1969). Yoji Yamada was also awarded Best Director at the ceremony for the same two films.

The German-language site molodezhnaja gives Tora-san's Cherished Mother three and a half out of five stars.

Releases
Tora-san's Cherished Mother was released theatrically on November 15, 1969.

Home media
In Japan, the film was released on videotape in 1983 and 1995, and in DVD format in 2005 and 2008. AnimEigo released the film on DVD in the US along with the other first four films in the Otoko wa Tsurai yo series on November 24, 2009.

References

Bibliography

English

German

Japanese

External links
 Tora-san's Cherished Mother at www.tora-san.jp (official site)

1969 films
Films directed by Yoji Yamada
Films set in Kyoto
Films set in Mie Prefecture
1969 comedy films
1960s Japanese-language films
Otoko wa Tsurai yo films
Shochiku films
Films with screenplays by Yôji Yamada
Japanese sequel films
1960s Japanese films